The 2014 New York Jets season was the franchise's 45th season in the National Football League and the 55th overall. The Jets failed to improve on their 8–8 regular season record in 2013 and were eliminated from postseason contention for the fourth consecutive season after a Week 12 loss to the Buffalo Bills. As a result, head coach Rex Ryan was fired on December 29, 2014, after compiling a 46–50 record in six seasons.

Transactions

Coaching and personnel changes
 Linebackers coach Brian VanGorder was hired as Notre Dame's defensive coordinator. Defensive quality control coach Bobby April III was promoted to replace VanGorder.
 Special teams coach Ben Kotwica was hired by the Washington Redskins for the same position. He was replaced by former LSU special teams coach Thomas McGaughey.
 The Jets promoted Tony Sparano Jr. to offensive assistant and hired former player Eric Smith as a seasonal intern.
 The Jets hired Aaron McLaurin as an assistant strength and conditioning coach and Kavan Latham as a strength and conditioning intern.

Arrivals
 The Jets signed Colin Anderson, T. J. Barnes, Tevita Finau, Michael Campbell, Dwight Jones, Dalton Freeman, Tim Fugger, and Rontez Miles to reserve/future contracts on December 31, 2013.
 The Jets signed Ras-I Dowling to a reserve/future contract on January 6, 2014.
 The Jets signed Patrick Ford and Lowell Rose to reserve/future contracts on January 8, 2014.
 The Jets signed Jacolby Ashworth and Nick Taylor to reserve/future contracts on January 14, 2014.
 The Jets signed Brandon Hardin to a reserve/future contract on January 15, 2014.
 The Jets signed Johnny Patrick off waivers on March 5, 2014.
 The Jets signed Breno Giacomini and Eric Decker on March 12, 2014.
 The Jets signed Michael Vick on March 21, 2014.
 The Jets signed Jeremy Reeves on March 28, 2014.
 The Jets signed Jacoby Ford and Dimitri Patterson on April 1, 2014.
 The Jets signed Chris Johnson on April 16, 2014.
 The Jets signed undrafted free agents Tevon Conrad, Steele Divitto, Anthony Grady, Kerry Hyder, Terrence Miller, Brent Qvale, Zach Thompson, and Chad Young on May 11, 2014.
 The Jets claimed Daryl Richardson off waivers on May 16, 2014.
 The Jets signed A. J. Edds and Markus Zusevics on May 19, 2014.
 The Jets signed Andrew Furney and Jacob Schum on June 19, 2014.
 The Jets signed Jason Babin on July 23, 2014.
 The Jets signed Michael Smith on August 1, 2014.
 The Jets signed Bruce Campbell on August 5, 2014.
 The Jets signed LeQuan Lewis on August 12, 2014.
 The Jets claimed Leon McFadden off waivers on August 31, 2014.
 The Jets signed Matt Simms, Daryl Richardson, Chris Pantale, Brent Qvale, Tevita Finau, Kerry Hyder, and Rontez Miles to the practice squad on August 31, 2014.
 The Jets signed Phillip Adams and A. J. Edds, claimed Walt Powell off waivers and signed LeQuan Lewis to the practice squad on September 1, 2014.
 The Jets signed Quincy Enunwa and Jeremiah George to the practice squad on September 2, 2014.
 The Jets re-signed Ellis Lankster on September 12, 2013.
 The Jets signed Brandon Smith to the practice squad on September 23, 2014.
 The Jets signed Marcus Williams to the practice squad on September 24, 2014.
 The Jets signed T. J. Graham and Chris Owusu on September 29, 2014.
 The Jets signed John Conner to the active roster and LeQuan Lewis to the practice squad on September 30, 2014.
 The Jets signed DaShaun Phillips to the practice squad on October 7, 2014.
 The Jets signed Josh Thomas and Wesley Johnson on October 13, 2014.
 The Jets signed Chris Young to the practice squad on October 29, 2014.
 The Jets signed Chris Owusu to the practice squad on November 3, 2014.
 The Jets signed Kona Schwenke to the practice squad on December 3, 2014.
 The Jets signed Keith Lewis to the practice squad on December 9, 2014.
 The Jets signed Mario Harvey to the practice squad on December 16, 2014.

Departures
 The Jets released Antonio Cromartie on March 9, 2014.
 The Jets released Santonio Holmes on March 10, 2014.
 The Jets released Mark Sanchez on March 21, 2014.
 The Jets released Tevon Conrad on May 16, 2014.
 The Jets released Dwight Jones and Jacolby Ashworth on May 19, 2014.
 The Jets released Mike Goodson on June 18, 2014.
 The Jets released Terrence Miller on June 19, 2014.
 The Jets released Lowell Rose on July 23, 2014.
 The Jets released Brandon Hardin on August 1, 2014.
 The Jets released Tim Fugger on August 12, 2014.
 The Jets released Michael Smith, Bruce Campbell, Patrick Ford, Markus Zusevics, Steele Divitto, Andrew Furney, and Jake Schum on August 23, 2014.
 The Jets released Jacoby Ford, Michael Campbell, Colin Anderson, Chad Young, Anthony Grady, and Ras-I Dowling.
 The Jets released Tajh Boyd, Matt Simms, Alex Green, Daryl Richardson, Clyde Gates, Stephen Hill, Chris Pantale, William Campbell, Brent Qvale, Caleb Schlauderaff, Tevita Finau, Kerry Hyder, Zach Thompson, Troy Davis, A. J. Edds, Garrett McIntyre, Brandon Dixon, Rontez Miles, Johnny Patrick, Dimitri Patterson and Jeremy Reeves on August 30, 2014.
 The Jets released LeQuan Lewis on August 31, 2014.
 The Jets released Quincy Enunwa, Jeremiah George, and Ellis Lankster on September 1, 2014.
 The Jets released Leon McFadden on September 11, 2014.
 The Jets released Ellis Lankster on September 23, 2014.
 The Jets released Jalen Saunders and LeQuan Lewis on September 29, 2014.
 The Jets released Brandon Smith from the practice squad on September 30, 2014.
 The Jets released LeQuan Lewis from the practice squad on October 7, 2014.
 The Jets released Josh Bush on October 15, 2014.
 The Jets released David Nelson on October 17, 2014.
 The Jets released A. J. Edds on October 28, 2014.
 The Jets released Chris Owusu on November 1, 2014.
 The Jets released Antwan Barnes on December 1, 2014.
 The Jets released Josh Thomas on December 16, 2014.

Trades

To Jets
 Percy Harvin was traded from the Seattle Seahawks to the Jets on October 17, 2014 in exchange for a conditional draft pick from New York in the 2015 NFL Draft.

Free Agents

Draft

Draft trades
 The Jets acquired an additional fourth-round selection as part of a trade that sent cornerback Darrelle Revis to the Tampa Bay Buccaneers.
 The Jets were awarded four compensatory selections after losing free agents Yeremiah Bell, LaRon Landry, Mike DeVito, Shonn Greene, Dustin Keller, and Matt Slauson.

Preseason

Regular season

Schedule

Note: Intra-division opponents are in bold text.

Standings

Division

Conference

Staff

Final roster

Regular season results

Week 1: vs. Oakland Raiders

The Jets got off to a sloppy start when Raiders rookie starting QB Derek Carr torched the Jets defense early in the game to take a 7-3 lead after Charles Woodson picked off Jets 2nd year QB Geno Smith in his 17th start. However, the Jets quickly rebounded with a 5-yard shovel TD pass from Smith to Chris Johnson to take the lead 10-7 going into halftime. The Jets would never trail the rest of the game, although Carr threw a late TD pass to Raiders WR James Jones in garbage time, and attempted a failed onside kick. Chris Ivory had a solid day, rushing for 102 yards and a TD. The score came when Ivory ran 71 yards for a TD during the 4th quarter; it was the Jets' longest TD run since Thomas Jones 71-yard TD run back on October 19, 2009. Geno Smith completed a career-best 82.1% completion percentage (23/28 for 221 yards, 1 TD, 1 INT); it was the best performance delivered by a Jet quarterback since Chad Pennington completed 82.1% of his passes in a loss to the Buffalo Bills way back in 2007.

Week 2: at Green Bay Packers

After racing to a 21-3 lead in the second quarter, the Jets were outscored 28-3 for the remainder of the game.  A game-tying 37-yard touchdown throw by Geno Smith to Jeremy Kerley with five minutes to go in the fourth quarter was wiped out when assistant coach Marty Mornhinweg called the Jets' final timeout just as the ball was snapped; even more egregiously Mornhinweg was not authorized to call timeouts, the responsibility of head coach Rex Ryan.  The Jets failed to convert after this and fell 31-24; it marked only the second time for Packers quarterback Aaron Rodgers that he won a game despite a deficit exceeding eight points.

Week 3: vs. Chicago Bears

Week 4: vs. Detroit Lions

Week 5: at San Diego Chargers

Geno Smith was benched in the middle of this game for Michael Vick. CBS imposed the "mercy rule" (switching to another program) towards the end of this game because of how poorly the Jets were playing. This marked the third season in a row in which a New York team was the first team to be shut out in a game.

Week 6: vs. Denver Broncos

Week 7: at New England Patriots

The Patriots defeated the Jets, 27–25.  The Jets' offense drove to the Patriots' red zone on all four of their first-half drives.  However, they were held to four field goals while the Patriots scored two touchdowns and a field goal, building a 17–12 halftime lead. On their first drive in the second half, the Jets reached the end zone and took a 19–17 lead. The Patriots then scored ten unanswered points to go up 27-19. The Jets had a chance to tie the game with a touchdown and a two-point conversion.  However, Jets QB Geno Smith's game-tying pass was overthrown, and the Patriots led 27-25.  After a failed onside kick recovery, the Jets forced a three and out and got the ball back with just over one minute remaining.  The Jets drove from their 12-yard line to the Patriots' 40-yard line.  With 5 seconds remaining, Jets kicker Nick Folk was sent out to kick a game-winning 58-yard field goal.  The kick was blocked, and the Patriots held on for a 27-25 victory.  With the loss, the Jets fell to 1–6 as they lost their sixth consecutive game and remained in 4th place in the AFC East.  The Jets' six-game losing streak is the longest losing streak under head coach Rex Ryan.  The loss represented the first time that the Jets had lost six consecutive games since they dropped  six in a row from Weeks 4–9 during the 2007 season.
The loss also led to a trade the next day with the Seahawks for receiver Percy Harvin.

Week 8: vs. Buffalo Bills
 Geno Smith would be benched in the 1st quarter after throwing 3 interceptions and posting a QBR of 0.04.

Week 9: at Kansas City Chiefs

Week 10: vs. Pittsburgh Steelers

Week 12: at Buffalo Bills

With the loss, the Jets fell to 2–9, and were mathematically eliminated from postseason contention for the fourth consecutive season.

Week 13: vs. Miami Dolphins

Week 14: at Minnesota Vikings

The Jets were the only AFC East team to lose to all of their NFC North opponents.

Week 15: at Tennessee Titans

Week 16: vs. New England Patriots

Week 17: at Miami Dolphins

Quarterback Geno Smith finished the season by posting a perfect 158.3 passer rating against the Dolphins.

Notes

References

External links
 
 2014 New York Jets at Pro Football Reference

New York Jets
New York Jets seasons
New York Jets season
21st century in East Rutherford, New Jersey
Meadowlands Sports Complex